Robert Morris (1701–1754), born in Twickenham, was one of the most influential 18th-century English writers on architecture. His patternbook plates have been identified as the principal design sources for several prominent houses of colonial America, including Brandon (begun 1765) in Prince George County, Virginia, and Battersea (begun 1768) in Petersburg, Virginia.

Life
He received his instruction in architecture in the service of his 'kinsman,' Roger Morris, 'Carpenter and principal engineer to the Board of Ordnance,' who died on 31 January 1749.

The earliest executed work ascribed to Morris is Inveraray Castle (Gothic), begun in 1745, and after considerable delay completed in 1761. It seems probable that Roger Morris was concerned in the design, and that the building was erected after his death under the supervision of his pupil Robert. The central tower was destroyed by fire on 12 Oct. 1877, and restored in 1880. With S. Wright, Morris erected for George II the central portion of the lodge in Richmond Park, the design of which is sometimes attributed to Thomas Herbert, 10th earl of Pembroke. The wings were added in later years.

About 1750, he repaired and modernised for G. Bubb Dodington the house at Hammersmith afterwards known as Brandenburgh House. It was pulled down in 1822, and a house of the same name was afterwards built in the grounds, but not on the same site.

Morris also erected Coomb Bank, Kent, and Wimbledon House, Surrey. In the design of the latter he was probably associated with the Earl of Burlington. The house was destroyed by fire in 1785 ; the offices were subsequently used as a residence until 1801, when the new house designed by Henry Holland was completed. With the Earl of Burlington, Morris designed, about 1750, Kirby Hall, Yorkshire, in the interior of which John Carr of York was employed. The plans are said to have been suggested by the owner, S. Thompson. In 1736, he erected a bridge (after a design of Palladio) in the grounds of Wilton in Wiltshire.

Vegetarianism
Morris was an early advocate of animal rights and vegetarianism. He authored the essay A Reasonable Plea for the Animal Creation (1746). Carol J. Adams considers it a valuable addition to vegetarian history. In 2005, the academic journal Organization & Environment re-published the essay.

Selected works

Essays
 An Essay in Defence of Ancient Architecture (1728)
 Lectures on Architecture (1734-6)
 An Essay on Harmony. As it Relates Chiefly to Situation and Building (1739)
 The Art of Architecture, a Poem. In Imitation of Horace's ‘Art of Poetry (1742)
 A Reasonable Plea for the Animal Creation (1746)

Pattern books
 Rural Architecture (1750), retitled Select Architecture in later editions
 The Architectural Remembrancer (1751), retitled Architecture Improved in later editions
 Select Architecture : Being Regular Designs of Plans and Elevations Well Suited to Both Town and Country (1755)

References

Attribution

Sources
 

1703 births
1754 deaths
18th-century English non-fiction writers
British vegetarianism activists
English animal rights activists
English architecture writers
Writers from Twickenham